Ari Posner (born 1970) is a Canadian film and television composer, most noted as a multiple Canadian Screen Award winner for his television scores.

A native of Winnipeg, Manitoba, he moved to Toronto, Ontario, in 1989 to study music at York University. He is a frequent collaborator with composer Amin Bhatia. He has also been a record producer, most notably on Jen Gould's album Music Soup, which was the winner of the Juno Award for Children's Album of the Year at the Juno Awards of 2008.

Filmography

Film

Television

Awards

References

External links

1970 births
Living people
20th-century Canadian composers
21st-century Canadian composers
Canadian film score composers
Canadian television composers
Canadian record producers
Canadian Screen Award winners
Jewish Canadian musicians
Musicians from Winnipeg